The Sony Xperia Z5 Premium is an Android smartphone produced by Sony. Part of the Sony Xperia Z series, the device, at that point known by the project code name "Satsuki", was unveiled along with the Sony Xperia Z5 and Xperia Z5 Compact during a press conference at IFA 2015 on September 2, 2015. The device was first released in Taiwan on November 5, 2015, and was the first smartphone with 4K resolution.

The Sony Xperia Z5 Premium is an up-scaled version of the Xperia Z5 and is the first ever smartphone to feature a 4K display. Similarly to the Xperia Z5, the device also features a fingerprint reader and a 23 Megapixel camera with 0.03 seconds Hybrid Autofocus that utilizes phase detection autofocus.

Specifications

Unlike the Xperia Z5, the device features a 4K  screen with the resolution of 3840×2160 pixels whilst still retaining 2 hours and 30 minutes of battery life.

Hardware

The Sony Xperia Z5 Premium has a 5.5-inch IPS LCD display, Octa-core (4x1.5 GHz Cortex-A53 & 4x2.0 GHz Cortex-A57) Qualcomm Snapdragon 810 processor, 3 GB of RAM and 32 GB of internal storage that can be expanded using microSD cards up to 256 GB. The phone has a 3430 mAh Li-Ion battery, 23 MP rear camera with an LED flash and a 5.1 MP front-facing camera with auto-focus. It is available in Chrome, Black, Gold, Pink colors.

Software
The Xperia Z5 Premium is preinstalled with Android 5.1 Lollipop with Sony's custom interface and software.

It also has been upgraded to run Android 6.0 Marshmallow.

On August 23, 2016, Sony announced that the Xperia Z5 Premium would receive an upgrade to Android 7.0 Nougat.

On February 16, 2017, Android 7.0 Nougat has been upgraded for the Sony Xperia Z5 Premium Dual Sim E6883. On June 28, 2017, it started to roll out the Android 7.1.1 Nougat firmware update.

Variants

References

External links
 Official Press Release
 Official Website
 Official Whitepaper 
 Official Whitepaper (Dual SIM version) 

Android (operating system) devices
Discontinued flagship smartphones
Sony smartphones
Mobile phones introduced in 2015
Digital audio players
Mobile phones with 4K video recording